Kongsak P.K. Saenchai Muaythai Gym, also known as Kongsak Sitboonmee, is a Thai Muay Thai fighter, originally from Buriram, in the northeast of Thailand, but now fighting out of Bangkok. Well known for his powerful middle kicks, Kongsak is currently ranked third in the Lumpinee Stadium Lightweight division and ranks third in the Channel 7 Stadium Super-light weight division as well.

He is a former 130lbs. and 126lbs. Lumpinee Stadium champion. He holds wins over fighters such as Nong-O Kaiyanghadaogym, Pornsanae Sitmonchai, Pakorn PKSaenchaimuaythaigym and Jomthong Chuwattana.

Career
Kongsak started training at age of 9, having been discovered by his famous uncle Changpuek Kiatsongrit. He joined the Sitboonmee camp at the age of 11 and  trained and fought for the same camp until 2013, when he moved to the PKSaenchaimuaythaigym camp.

Titles and accomplishments
Lumpinee Stadium
2013 Lumpinee Stadium 130lbs. Champion
2011 Lumpinee Stadium 130lbs. Champion
2010 Lumpinee Stadium 126lbs. Champion
World Muaythai Council
2011 World Muay Thai Council (WMC) 132lbs. Champion
Professional Boxing Association of Thailand
2010 Thailand (PAT) 126lbs. Champion
Sports Writers Association of Thailand
2010 Sports Writers Association of Thailand Fighter of the Year

Fight record

|- style="background:#fbb" 
| 2022-11-04 || Loss ||align="left" | Ilyas Musaev || Rajadamnern World Series  || Bangkok, Thailand || KO (High kick) || 1||2:40 
|- style="background:#cfc" 
| 2022-08-26 || Win ||align="left" | Klasuek VenumMuayThai  || Rajadamnern World Series  || Bangkok, Thailand || KO (Elbow) || 2|| 1:42
|-  style="background:#fbb;"
| 2021-12-05|| Loss ||align=left| Jeremy Payet || Muay Thai Grand Prix France ||Paris, France || Decision || 3 ||3:00
|-  style="background:#CCFFCC;"
| 2019-11-08|| Win ||align=left| Han Zihao ||ONE Championship: Masters of Fate||Manila, Philippines || Decision (Unanimous) || 3 ||3:00
|-  style="background:#CCFFCC;"
| 2019-02-16|| Win ||align=left| Alaverdi Ramazanov || ONE Championship: Clash of Legends || Bangkok, Thailand || Decision (Split)|| 3 || 3:00
|-  style="background:#fbb;"
| 2018-11-13|| Loss ||align=left| Rafi Bohic || Lumpinee Stadium ||Thailand || TKO || 3 || 3:00
|-|-  style="background:#cfc;"
| 2018-04-21|| Win || align="left" | Daniel Ghercioiu|| THAI FIGHT Rome  || Rome, Italy || KO (Left High Kick + Left Punch) || 2 ||
|-|-  style="background:#cfc;"
| 2018-03-24|| Win || align="left" | Sif El Islam || THAI FIGHT Mueang Khon 2018 || Nakhon Si Thammarat, Thailand || KO (Left Cross to the Body) || 1 ||
|-  style="background:#cfc;"
| 2018-01-27|| Win ||align=left| Arthur Sorsor || THAI FIGHT Bangkok || Bangkok, Thailand || KO (Left Elbow) || 2 ||
|-  style="background:#fbb;"
| 2017-09-30|| Loss ||align=left| Marc Dass Rey|| THAI FIGHT Barcelona || Barcelona, Spain || Decision || 3 || 3:00
|-  style="background:#cfc;"
| 2017-07-15|| Win ||align=left| Vahid Shahbazi || THAI FIGHT We Love Yala || Yala, Thailand || KO (Left Cross) || 1 ||
|-  style="background:#cfc;"
| 2017-05-31|| Win||align=left| Phonek Or.Kwanmuang|| Sor.Sommai, Rajadamnern Stadium || Bangkok, Thailand || Decision || 5 || 3:00

|-  style="background:#cfc;"
| 2017-04-29 || Win ||align=left| Sean Clancy || THAI FIGHT Samui 2017 || Ko Samui, Thailand || KO (Left Cross) || 1 || 
|-  style="background:#fbb;"
| 2016-11-24|| Loss ||align=left| Petpanomrung Kiatmuu9|| Rajadamnern Stadium || Bangkok, Thailand || Decision || 5 || 3:00
|-  style="background:#cfc;"
| 2016-10-30 || Win ||align=left| Shingo Yamato || || Japan || KO (head kick) || 4 || 
|-  style="background:#cfc;"
| 2016-09-24|| Win ||align=left| Indrachai Chor Haphayak || Thai Rath TV || Bangkok, Thailand || KO (elbow) || 5 || 3:00
|-  style="background:#cfc;"
| 2016-06-09|| Win ||align=left| Kaiwanlek Tor Laksong|| Rajadamnern Stadium || Bangkok, Thailand || KO (punch) || 3 ||
|-  style="background:#fbb;"
| 2016-05-05 || Loss ||align=left| Yodlekpet Or. Pitisak  || Rajadamnern Stadium || Bangkok, Thailand || Decision || 5 || 3:00 
|-  style="background:#fbb;"
| 2016-04-04 || Loss ||align=left| Kiatpet Suanahanpeekmai || Rajadamnern Stadium || Bangkok, Thailand || Decision || 5 || 3:00 
|-  style="background:#fbb;"
| 2015-06-30 || Loss ||align=left| Chujaroen Dabransarakarm || Lumpinee Stadium || Bangkok, Thailand || Decision || 5 || 3:00
|-  style="background:#cfc;"
| 2015-05-10 || Win ||align=left| Tetsuya Yamato || NJKF || Japan || Decision || 5 || 3:00 
|-
|-  style="background:#cfc;"
| 2015-04-26|| Win ||align=left| Petchboonchu FA Group || Rangsit Stadium || Bangkok, Thailand || Decision || 5 || 3:00 
|-
|-  style="background:#cfc;"
| 2015-01-15|| Win ||align=left| Yodpanomrung Jitmuangnon || Rajadamnern Stadium || Bangkok, Thailand || Decision || 5 || 3:00 
|-  style="background:#fbb;"
| 2014-09-11 || Loss ||align=left| Saeksan Or. Kwanmuang || Rajadamnern Stadium || Bangkok, Thailand || Decision || 5 || 3:00 
|-  style="background:#cfc;"
| 2014-08-08 || Win ||align=left| Penake Sitnumnoi || Lumpinee Stadium || Bangkok, Thailand || Decision || 5 || 3:00 
|-  style="background:#cfc;"
| 2014-07-08|| Win ||align=left| Phetmorakot wor sangprapai|| Lumpinee Stadium || Bangkok, Thailand || Decision || 5 || 3:00 
|-  style="background:#cfc;"
| 2014-06-06|| Win ||align=left| Penake Sitnumnoi || Lumpinee Stadium || Bangkok, Thailand || Decision || 5 || 3:00 
|-  style="background:#c5d2ea;"
| 2014-05-08|| Draw ||align=left| Phetmorakot wor sangprapai || Rajadamnern Stadium || Bangkok, Thailand || Decision || 5 || 3:00
|-  style="background:#cfc;"
| 2014-02-18|| Win ||align=left| Denpanom Ror Kilacorat|| Lumpinee Stadium || Bangkok, Thailand || KO(Left Elbow)|| 5 || 3:00 
|-  style="background:#fbb;"
| 2014-01-07 || Loss ||align=left| Singdam Kiatmuu9 || Rajadamnern Stadium || Bangkok, Thailand || Decision || 5 || 3:00 
|-  style="background:#fbb;"
| 2013-12-03 || Loss ||align=left| Pakorn PKSaenchaimuaythaigym || Lumpinee Stadium || Bangkok, Thailand || Decision || 5 || 3:00
|-
! style=background:white colspan=9 |
|-  style="background:#fbb;"
| 2013-10-11 || Loss ||align=left| Saenchai PKSaenchaimuaythaigym || Lumpinee Stadium || Bangkok, Thailand || Decision || 5 || 3:00
|-  style="background:#fbb;"
| 2013-09-04 || Loss ||align=left| Saenchai PKSaenchaimuaythaigym || Rajadamnern Stadium || Bangkok, Thailand || Decision || 5 || 3:00
|-  style="background:#fbb;"
| 2013-08-08 || Loss ||align=left| Saenchai PKSaenchaimuaythaigym || Rajadamnern Stadium || Bangkok, Thailand || Decision || 5 || 3:00
|-  style="background:#cfc;"
| 2013-07-12|| Win ||align=left| Petchboonchu FA Group || Lumpinee Stadium || Bangkok, Thailand || Decision || 5 || 3:00 
|-  style="background:#cfc;"
| 2013-06-07|| Win ||align=left| Petpanomrung Kiatmuu9|| Lumpinee Stadium || Bangkok, Thailand || Decision || 5 || 3:00
|-
! style=background:white colspan=9 |
|-  style="background:#fbb;"
| 2013-04-09 || Loss ||align=left| Nong-O Kaiyanghadaogym || Lumpinee Stadium || Bangkok, Thailand || Decision || 5 || 3:00
|-  style="background:#cfc;"
| 2012-12-24|| Win ||align=left| Singtongnoi Por.Telakun || Rajadamnern Stadium || Bangkok, Thailand || Decision || 5 || 3:00
|-  style="background:#fbb;"
| 2012-11-09 || Loss ||align=left| Yodwicha Por Boonsit || Lumpinee Stadium || Bangkok, Thailand || Decision || 5 || 3:00 
|-
! style=background:white colspan=9 |
|-  style="background:#cfc;"
| 2012-10-11|| Win ||align=left| Yodwicha Por Boonsit|| Rajadamnern Stadium || Bangkok, Thailand || Decision || 5 || 3:00 
|-  style="background:#cfc;"
| 2012-09-12|| Win ||align=left| Saeksan Or. Kwanmuang || Rajadamnern Stadium || Bangkok, Thailand || Decision || 5 || 3:00
|-  style="background:#cfc;"
| 2012-05-17|| Win ||align=left| Petek Kiatyongyut|| Rajadamnern Stadium || Bangkok, Thailand || Decision || 5 || 3:00 
|-  style="background:#cfc;"
| 2012-03-30|| Win ||align=left| Pettawee Sor Kittichai || South Thailand || Thailand || KO || 3 || 
|-  style="background:#fbb;"
| 2012-02-28|| Loss ||align=left| Pakorn PKSaenchaimuaythaigym|| Lumpinee Stadium || Bangkok, Thailand || Decision || 5 || 3:00 
|-  style="background:#fbb;"
| 2012-01-26|| Loss||align=left| Pakorn PKSaenchaimuaythaigym|| Rajadamnern Stadium || Bangkok, Thailand || Decision || 5 || 3:00
|-  style="background:#cfc;"
| 2011-12-22|| Win ||align=left| Jomthong Chuwattana|| Rajadamnern Stadium || Bangkok, Thailand || Decision || 5 || 3:00
|-  style="background:#fbb;"
| 2011-09-06|| Loss ||align=left| F-16 Rachanon || Lumpinee Stadium || Bangkok, Thailand || Decision || 5 || 3:00 
|-
! style=background:white colspan=9 |
|-  style="background:#cfc;"
| 2011-08-02|| Win ||align=left| F-16 Rachanon || Lumpinee Stadium || Bangkok, Thailand || Decision || 5 || 3:00 
|-  style="background:#fbb;"
| 2011-07-07 || Loss ||align=left| Saenchai PKSaenchaimuaythaigym || Rajadamnern Stadium || Bangkok, Thailand || Decision || 5 || 3:00
|-  style="background:#cfc;"
| 2011-06-10|| Win ||align=left| Nong-O Kaiyanghadaogym|| Lumpinee Stadium || Bangkok, Thailand || Decision || 5 || 3:00 
|-
! style=background:white colspan=9 |
|-  bgcolor="#c5d2ea"
| 2011-05-10 || Draw ||align=left|  Sam-A Kaiyanghadaogym || Lumpinee Stadium || Bangkok, Thailand || Decision draw || 5 || 3:00
|-  style="background:#cfc;"
| 2011-04-06|| Win ||align=left| Petek Kiatyongyut ||  || Songkhla, Thailand || Decision || 5 || 3:00
|-  style="background:#cfc;"
| 2011-03-15|| Win ||align=left| Pakorn PKSaenchaimuaythaigym|| Lumpinee Stadium || Bangkok, Thailand || Decision || 5 || 3:00 
|-  style="background:#cfc;"
| 2011-02-21|| Win ||align=left| Singtongnoi Por.Telakun|| Rajadamnern Stadium || Bangkok, Thailand || Decision || 5 || 3:00 
|-  style="background:#cfc;"
| 2010-12-07|| Win ||align=left| Pornsanae Sitmonchai|| Lumpinee Stadium || Bangkok, Thailand || Decision || 5 || 3:00
|-
! style=background:white colspan=9 |
|-  style="background:#cfc;"
| 2010-11-02|| Win ||align=left| Pettawee Sor Kittichai|| Lumpinee Stadium || Bangkok, Thailand || TKO(Referee Stoppage/elbows)|| 3 || 3:00
|| 
|-
|-  style="background:#cfc;"
| 2010-10-05|| Win ||align=left| Detnarong Wor Sangprapai|| Lumpinee Stadium || Bangkok, Thailand || Decision || 5 || 3:00 
|-  style="background:#cfc;"
| 2010-08-24|| Win ||align=left| Traijak Sitjomtrai|| Lumpinee Stadium || Bangkok, Thailand || Decision || 5 || 3:00 
|-  style="background:#cfc;"
| 2010-07-23|| Win ||align=left| Palangtip Nor Sripuang|| Lumpinee Stadium || Bangkok, Thailand || Decision || 5 || 3:00 
|-  style="background:#cfc;"
| 2010-05-|| Win ||align=left| Senkeng Jor Nopparat || Omnoi Stadium || Bangkok, Thailand || Decision || 5 || 3:00 
|-  style="background:#cfc;"
| 2010-02-09|| Win ||align=left| Lekkla Tanasuranakon	 || Lumpinee Stadium || Bangkok, Thailand || Decision || 5 || 3:00 
|-  style="background:#fbb;"
| 2009-12-29|| Loss ||align=left| Rungpet Wor.Sungprapai|| Lumpinee Stadium || Bangkok, Thailand || Decision || 5 || 3:00
|-  style="background:#fbb;"
| 2009-07-24|| Loss ||align=left| Werayut Lukpetnoi|| Lumpinee Stadium || Bangkok, Thailand || Decision || 5 || 3:00 

|-  style="background:#cfc;"
| 2009-05-23|| Win ||align=left| Kaimukkao Sit.Or|| Omnoi stadium || Samut Sakhon, Thailand || KO (Elbow) || 4 ||

|-  style="background:#cfc;"
| 2009-04-10|| Win ||align=left| Kaichon Siamgsawangnapa|| Lumpinee Stadium || Bangkok, Thailand || KO || 4 ||

|-  style="background:#fbb;"
| 2008-09-19|| Loss ||align=left| Saeksan Or. Kwanmuang || Lumpinee Stadium || Bangkok, Thailand || Decision || 5 || 3:00

|-  style="background:#cfc;"
| 2008-07-29|| Win ||align=left| Detkamon Himalaigym|| Lumpinee Stadium|| Bangkok, Thailand || TKO || 4 || 
|-  style="background:#cfc;"
| 2007-06-22|| Win ||align=left| Wanchailek Kiatphukam|| Lumpinee Stadium || Bangkok, Thailand || Decision || 5 || 3:00 
|-  style="background:#cfc;"
| 2007-04-06|| Win ||align=left|  Krittongkam Tor Surachet|| Lumpinee Stadium || Bangkok, Thailand || Decision || 5 || 3:00 
|-
| colspan=9 | Legend:

References

Kongsak P.K.Saenchaimuaythaigym
Living people
Kongsak P.K.Saenchaimuaythaigym
ONE Championship kickboxers
1991 births